Thorowgood is a surname. Notable people with the surname include:

Thomas Thorowgood (1595– 1669), English Puritan minister and preacher
William Thorowgood (died 1877), British typographer and type founder

See also
Thorogood